Lorance Township is one of eight townships in Bollinger County, Missouri, USA. As of the 2000 U.S. Census, its population was 4,406. As of the 2010 U.S. Census, the population had decreased to 4,366.

Lorance Township was established in 1827, and named in honor of John Lorance, a pioneer citizen.

Demographics
As of the 2010 U.S. Census, there were 4,366 people living in the township. There were 1,983 housing units in the township. The racial makeup of the township was 97.50% White, 0.07% Black or African American, 0.62% Native American, 0.37% Asian, 0.25% from other races, and 1.19% from two or more races. Approximately 1.01% of the population were Hispanic or Latino of any race.

Geography

Incorporated Areas
The township contains two incorporated settlements: Glen Allen and Marble Hill.

Unincorporated Areas
The township contains the unincorporated areas and historical communities of Laflin and Leopold.

Cemeteries
The township contains the following 17 cemeteries: Bailey, Baker, Barks, Buehler, County Memorial Park, Crader, Deck, Dry Creek, Eaker, Ebenezer, Hahn, Lessley, Myers, Perkins, Saint Johns, Shell, and Shelton.

Streams
The streams of Bear Branch, Cedar Branch, Chicken Branch, Dockins Branch, Dillard Creek, Drunken Creek, Farmer Branch, Gimlet Creek, Granny Creek, Hog Creek, Hurricane Creek, Limbaugh Branch, Little Blue Branch, Little Crooked Creek, Little Dry Creek, Opossum Creek, Sunny Brook, and Turkey Branch flow through Lorance Township. Other bodies of water located in the township include Bollinger Lake, Lake of the Hills, Lukefahr Lake, Marquis Lake, and Reed Lake.

Landmarks
Grassy Tower 
Grassy Tower Site State Public Hunting Area 
Pellegrino Park

Transportation
Lorance Township contains one airport or landing strip: Twin City Airpark in Marble Hill.

Administrative Districts

School Districts
Leopold R-III School District 
Woodland R-IV School District

Political Districts
Missouri's 8th Congressional District
State House District 145 
State Senate District 27

References

 USGS Geographic Names Information System (GNIS)

External links
 US-Counties.com
 City-Data.com

Townships in Bollinger County, Missouri
Cape Girardeau–Jackson metropolitan area
Townships in Missouri